Josie Padluq (1971) is an Inuit artist.

His work is included in the collections of the Musée national des beaux-arts du Québec and the Penn Museum

References

Living people
1971 births
20th-century Canadian artists
21st-century Canadian artists
Inuit artists